Riaz Hussain may refer to, 
 Riaz Hussain (politician), first governor of Balochistan province of Pakistan
 Malik Riaz Hussain, Pakistani businessman